Papuadytes desii is a species of predacious water beetle from the family Dytiscidae which is endemic to Papua New Guinea.

References

Dytiscidae
Beetles described in 1998
Endemic fauna of Papua New Guinea